This article contains information about the literary events and publications of 1976.

Events
January – The first Kolkata Book Fair opens in India.
June 21 – The Market Theatre (Johannesburg) is opened as a multiracial venue by Barney Simon.
September 3 – Novelist Antonio di Benedetto is released from prison after 18 months of imprisonment and torture under the National Reorganization Process (military dictatorship) in Argentina.
September 9 – The Royal Shakespeare Company starts a noted production of Shakespeare's Macbeth at The Other Place, Stratford-upon-Avon, England, with Ian McKellen and Judi Dench in the leading roles, directed by Trevor Nunn.
October 25 – The Royal National Theatre on London's South Bank opens in premises designed by Sir Denys Lasdun, with a performance of Goldoni's 18th-century comedy Il Campiello. Its Lyttleton Theatre first previews on 8 March, followed on 16 March by a performance of Shakespeare's Hamlet by Albert Finney directed by Peter Hall. Its Olivier Theatre opens on October 4 with Marlowe's Elizabethan drama Tamburlaine, also with Finney in the title rôle, directed by Peter Hall.
unknown dates
Théâtre Nanterre-Amandiers is established in new premises at Nanterre.
Saul Bellow wins both the Nobel Prize for Literature and the Pulitzer Prize for Fiction.

New books

Fiction
Émile Ajar (Romain Gary) – Hocus Bogus
Kingsley Amis – The Alteration
Ann Beattie – Chilly Scenes of Winter
Peter Benchley – The Deep
Marjorie Bowen – Kecksies and Other Twilight Tales
 John Braine – Waiting for Sheila
William F. Buckley – Saving the Queen (the first Blackford Oakes thriller)
Anthony Burgess – Beard's Roman Women
Ramsey Campbell – The Height of the Scream
Raymond Carver – Will You Please Be Quiet, Please?
Agatha Christie (posthumous) – Sleeping Murder (the last Miss Marple story, written c. 1940)
L. Sprague de Camp – The Virgin & the Wheels
Samuel R. Delany – Triton
August Derleth – Dwellers in Darkness
Philip K. Dick and Roger Zelazny – Deus Irae
G. B. Edwards (posthumous) – The Book of Ebenezer Le Page
Buchi Emecheta – The Bride Price
Marian Engel – Bear
Brian Garfield – The Last Hard Men
Judith Guest – Ordinary People
Alex Haley – Roots: The Saga of an American Family
Frank Herbert – Children of Dune
Bohumil Hrabal – Too Loud a Solitude (Příliš hlučná samota) (samizdat publication)
Derek Lambert – Blackstone Underground
Ira Levin – The Boys from Brazil
Robert Ludlum – The Gemini Contenders
Ryū Murakami (村上 龍) – Almost Transparent Blue (限りなく透明に近いブルー, Kagirinaku tōmei ni chikai burū)
R. K. Narayan – The Painter of Signs
Larry Niven and Jerry Pournelle – Inferno
Breandán Ó hEithir – Lig Sinn i gCathú
Michael Ondaatje - Coming Through Slaughter
Marge Piercy – Woman on the Edge of Time
Anthony Powell – Infants of the Spring
Terry Pratchett – The Dark Side of the Sun
J. B. Priestley – Found, Lost, Found
Manuel Puig – Kiss of the Spider Woman (El beso de la mujer araña)
Jean Raspail – Le Jeu du RoiRuth Rendell – A Demon in My ViewAnne Rice – Interview with the VampireTom Sharpe – WiltSidney Sheldon – A Stranger in the MirrorAlan Sillitoe – The Widower's SonSasha Sokolov – A School for FoolsMuriel Spark – The TakeoverJohn Steinbeck –  The Acts of King Arthur and His Noble KnightsJacqueline Susann – DoloresPaul Theroux – The Family ArsenalJesús Torbado – En el día de hoyLeon Uris – TrinityGore Vidal – 1876Kurt Vonnegut – Slapstick, or Lonesome No More!Alice Walker – MeridianRoger ZelaznyDoorways in the SandThe Hand of OberonMy Name is LegionChildren and young people
Richard Adams – The Tyger VoyageNatalie Babbitt – Tuck EverlastingJudy BlumeBlubberTales of a Fourth Grade NothingNancy Bond – A String in the HarpMichael de Larrabeiti – The BorriblesPenelope Lively – A Stitch in TimeRuth Manning-Sanders – A Book of MonstersRuth Park – The Muddle-Headed Wombat on Clean-Up DayMarc Brown – Arthur's Nose (first in the Arthur Adventure series of 27 books)

Drama
Samuel BeckettFootfallsThat TimeHoward Brenton – Weapons of HappinessKen Campbell – Illuminatus!Athol Fugard – Sizwe Banzi Is DeadAlbert Innaurato – GeminiNtozake Shange – For Colored Girls Who Have Considered Suicide / When the Rainbow Is EnufNon-fiction
Maya Angelou – Singin' and Swingin' and Gettin' Merry Like ChristmasL. Sprague de Camp – Literary Swordsmen and SorcerersRichard Dawkins – The Selfish GeneNorman F. Dixon – On the Psychology of Military IncompetenceElisabeth Elliot – Let Me Be a WomanMichel Foucault – Histoire de la sexualité, 1: La Volonte de savoirJulien Gracq – The Narrow WatersChristopher Isherwood – Christopher and His KindRyszard Kapuściński – Another Day of LifeJohn Keegan – The Face of BattleMaxine Hong Kingston – The Woman WarriorArthur Koestler – The Thirteenth TribeH. P. LovecraftSelected Letters IV (1932–1934)Selected Letters V (1934–1937)To Quebec and the StarsPaul Morand – The Allure of ChanelPeter C. Newman – The Canadian EstablishmentCarlos Rangel – From the Noble Savage to the Noble RevolutionaryArnold J. Toynbee – Mankind and Mother EarthAndrew Vachss – The Life-Style Violent JuvenileSimon Wiesenthal – The SunflowerBob Woodward & Carl Bernstein – The Final DaysBirths
February 3 – Isla Fisher, Australian actress and author
April 4 – Trevor Shane, American writer
July 5 – Claudia Salazar Jiménez, Peruvian writer, editor and academic
August 29 – T. James Belich (Colorado Tolston), American playwright, novelist and actor
October 31 – Seth Abramson, American professor and poetunknown datesMarion Brunet, French young adult and crime fiction writer
Jon McGregor, Bermuda-born British fiction writer
Bora Chung, Korean short story writer and novelist

Deaths
January 12 – Agatha Christie, English crime writer (born 1890)
January 25 – Victor Ehrenberg, German historian (born 1891)
February 2 – Barbara Euphan Todd, English children's writer (born 1890)
February 12 – John Lewis, Welsh philosopher (born 1889)
March 7 – Tove Ditlevsen, Danish poet and fiction writer, suicide (born 1917)
March 13 – Sergiu Dan, Romanian novelist and journalist (born 1903)
March 24 – E. H. Shepard, English illustrator and autobiographer (born 1879)
March 31 – Edward Streeter, American humorist (born 1891)
April 17 – Allardyce Nicoll, British literary scholar (born 1894)
April 22 – Joe David Brown, American novelist and journalist (born 1915)
April 28 – Richard Hughes, British novelist (born 1900)
May 7 – Alison Uttley, English writer of children's books (born 1884)
June 18 – Malcolm Johnson, American journalist (born 1904)
July 3 – Alexander Lernet-Holenia, Austrian poet, dramatist and fiction writer (born 1897)
August 29 – Kazi Nazrul Islam, Bengali poet (born 1899)
September 10 – Dalton Trumbo, American novelist and screenwriter (born 1905)
October 30 – Barbu Solacolu, Romanian poet, translator and economist (born 1897)
November 4 – Robert Speaight, English actor, biographer and essayist (born 1904)
November 6 – Patrick Dennis, American novelist (pancreatic cancer, born 1921)
November 23 – André Malraux, French novelist (born 1901)
December 21 – Munro Leaf, American children's author (born 1905)
December 22 – Martín Luis Guzmán, Mexican novelist and journalist (born 1887)
December 26 – Yashpal, Hindi novelist (born 1903)
December 29 – G. B. Edwards, Guernsey-born writer (born 1899)

Awards
Nobel Prize for Literature: Saul Bellow

Canada
See 1976 Governor General's Awards for a complete list of winners and finalists for those awards.

France
Prix Goncourt: Patrick Grainville, Les FlamboyantsPrix Médicis French: Marc Cholodenko, Les États du désertPrix Médicis International: Doris Lessing, The Gold Coronet – United Kingdom

Spain
Premio Miguel de Cervantes: Jorge Guillén

United Kingdom
Booker Prize: David Storey, SavilleCarnegie Medal for children's literature: Jan Mark, Thunder and LightningsCholmondeley Award: Peter Porter, Fleur Adcock
Eric Gregory Award: Stewart Brown, Valerie Gillies, Paul Groves, Paul Hyland, Nigel Jenkins, Andrew Motion, Tom Paulin, William Peskett
James Tait Black Memorial Prize for fiction: John Banville, Doctor CopernicusJames Tait Black Memorial Prize for biography: Ronald Hingley, A New Life of ChekhovUnited States
Frost Medal: A. M. Sullivan
Nebula Award: Frederik Pohl, Man PlusNewbery Medal for children's literature: Susan Cooper, The Grey KingPulitzer Prize for Drama: Michael Bennett for concept, choreography, and direction; James Kirkwood, Jr. for book, Marvin Hamlisch for lyrics, Nicholas Dante for music, A Chorus LinePulitzer Prize for Fiction: Saul Bellow, Humboldt's GiftPulitzer Prize for Poetry: John Ashbery, Self-Portrait in a Convex MirrorElsewhere
Miles Franklin Award: David Ireland, The Glass CanoePremio Nadal: Raúl Guerra Garrido, Lectura insólita de El CapitalViareggio Prize: Mario Tobino, La bella degli specchi''

References

 
Years of the 20th century in literature